Spanish Broadcasting System, Inc. (SBS) is one of the largest owners and operators of radio stations in the United States. SBS is also invested in television and internet properties, deriving the majority of its income from advertising through its media products.

SBS owns the internet portal LaMusica.com. It also acquired WSBS-TV in Miami, Florida and WTCV in San Juan, Puerto Rico, the group of owned and operated TV stations for its Mega TV network.

SBS targets the U.S. Hispanic audience in eight geographic regions: Los Angeles, New York, Chicago, Miami, San Francisco, Puerto Rico, Orlando and Tampa.

History

Spanish Broadcasting System was founded by Pablo Raúl Alarcón Sr., who started in Spanish-language radio broadcasting in the early 1950s when he started his first radio station in Camagüey, Cuba, and his son, Raúl Alarcón Jr. Alarcón Sr. had acquired 14 radio stations by the time he fled Cuba with his family to the United States in 1960. In the U.S. he continued his career as an on-air personality at a New York radio station after arriving in the United States before being promoted to programming director. He subsequently owned a recording studio and advertising agency before borrowing $3.5 million USD to purchase the first SBS radio station, WSKQ-AM (La Super 1380) in 1983 with his son, Raúl Alarcón Jr. Alarcón Sr. would serve as SBS Chairman of the board of directors, while his son would serve as an account executive in the sales department.

SBS generated sales of about $20 million in its first year, confirming the influence of the growing Spanish-speaking audience. Raúl Alarcón Jr. became President of SBS and a director in October 1985. In 1988 SBS purchased its first FM station, regional Mexican KLAX 97.9 FM in Los Angeles. The company went public in the fall of 1991, raising $435.8 million by selling 21.8 million shares at $20 per share. SBS bought its third station, New York's WSKQ-FM, in 1989. In 1993 Alfredo Alonso was hired and reformatted it as Mega 97.9, La Mega, surpassing the market's longtime leader, the light rock station WLTW-FM, by 1998. A major turning point for Spanish radio occurred that year when media researchers at Arbitron rated La Mega's morning show number one over that of the radio personality Howard Stern. 

In 2002 the company created SBS Entertainment, a concert production arm. It also diversified by purchasing 80 percent of JuJu Media, the operator of the Spanish-English Web site LaMusica.com, which offered Latin music, entertainment, news, and culture. Later that year, at the insistence of Alarcón Jr., SBS launched KZAB-FM (La Sabrosa 93.5), targeting the Central American population in Los Angeles. In 2003, WSKQ was the most listened-to Spanish-language radio station in the United States. That year Alarcón Jr. told Billboard magazine, "My opinion is that radio programming continues to be an art. It is not a science. I will not argue with the fact that research gives you a good indication, a good road map."

Raúl Alarcón Jr. is the current Chief Executive Officer of SBS, a position he has held since June 1994. He also succeeded his father as Chairman of the board of directors on November 2, 1999. Alarcón Sr. would continue to serve as Chairman Emeritus. Alarcón Jr. is responsible for the company's long-range strategic planning and operational matters, and according to SBS's website, is instrumental in the acquisition and related financing of each SBS station.

In 2009, Raúl Alarcón Sr. was posthumously inducted into Billboards Latin Music Hall of Fame. On June 3, 2011, the heavily Cuban-American community of Union City, New Jersey honored Alarcón Sr. with a star on the Walk of Fame at Celia Cruz Plaza. Raúl Alarcón Jr. was present to accept the honors for his father.

Radio
SBS radio stations use one of six programming formats:Spanish tropical: salsa music, merengue, bachata, reggaetón dance musicRegional Mexican: ranchera, norteña, banda, cumbia music typically originating from regions of MexicoSpanish adult contemporary: soft romantic ballads, Spanish pop musicSpanish oldies: Latin/English music classics from the 1960s, 1970s, and 1980sAmerican top 40: current pop music hitsHurban: (Hispanic Urban) reggaetón dance music

Los Angeles
KLAX-FM 97.9 La Raza HD1 (regional Mexican)/Raza Clásicos 97.9 HD2 (regional Mexican oldies)
KXOL-FM Mega 96.3 HD1 (pop)/Mega 96.3 HD2 (Spanish Tropical)

New York
WSKQ-FM Mega 97.9 HD1 (Spanish Tropical)
WPAT-FM 93.1 Amor HD1 (Spanish Tropical & Spanish Adult Contemporary)/La Nueva 93.1 HD2 (Spanish Christian music)

Puerto Rico
WMEG La Mega 106.9 (CHR - Latin/American top 40)
WEGM La Mega 95.1 (CHR - Latin/American top 40)
WRXD Estereotempo 96.5 (Spanish adult contemporary)
WNVI Estereotempo 1040 (Spanish adult contemporary)
WZNT Zeta 93.7 (Spanish tropical)
WZMT Zeta 93.3 (Spanish tropical)
WIOB Zeta 97.5 (Spanish tropical) 
WODA La Nueva 94.7 (urban)
WNOD La Nueva 94.1 (urban)

Chicago
WLEY-FM La Ley 107.9 (regional Mexican)

Miami
WXDJ El Zol 106.7 (Spanish tropical)
WCMQ-FM Zeta 92.3 (Romantic Salsa & Spanish Love AC songs)
WRMA Ritmo 95.7 (Cubatón)
WRAZ Salsa 106.3 (Spanish tropical)
WMFM El Zol 107.9 (Spanish tropical)

San Francisco
KRZZ 93.3 La Raza (Regional Mexican)

Orlando
WPYO El Nuevo Zol 95.3 (Spanish tropical)

Tampa
WSUN (FM) El Nuevo Zol 97.1 (Spanish tropical)

SBS launched AIRE Radio Networks''' in 2014.

Internet
In addition to individual radio station websites, SBS operates www.lamusica.com and www.mega.tv'', all providing bilingual Spanish-English content about Latin music, entertainment and news.

Television

MEGA TV was launched on March 1, 2006 and operates as a Spanish-language entertainment station in South Florida, Puerto Rico and Las Vegas. The station's programming targets a young, U.S. Hispanic audience through televised radio-branded shows and general entertainment programs (music, celebrity, debate, interviews, personality based shows). Seventy percent of MEGA TV's programming is in-house created. MEGA TV is also available nationwide on DirecTV and AT&T U-Verse.

Stations
Stations are arranged alphabetically by state and by city of license.

Current

Arbitron lawsuit
Arbitron sued SBS in order to force it to reinstall encoders used for the Portable People Meter system of audience measurement. SBS and other members of the PPM Coalition contended that the PPM system has had a major negative impact on their ratings and therefore revenue, and asked the Federal Communications Commission (FCC) in investigate. Arbitron sued SBS for breach of a 2007 contract, including $2.5 million in payments owed since 2009. In February 2010, a court ordered SBS to reinstate, at least temporarily, the coding of its radio broadcasts for measurement by Arbitron.

Notes

References
Spanish Broadcasting System, Inc. 2006 Annual Report

External links

 Official site
  MEGA TV
  Lamusica.com

Los Angeles radio station websites
  Mega 96.3
   La Raza 97.9
San Francisco radio station website
  La Raza 93.3

New York radio station websites
  Mega 97.9
  Amor 93.1
Chicago radio station website
   La Ley 107.9

Puerto Rico radio station websites
  La Mega
 Play 96.5
 La Nueva 94
  Zeta 93

Miami radio station websites
   El Zol 106.7
   Zeta 92
  Ritmo 95.7
Orlando radio station website
   El Nuevo Zol 95.3
Tampa radio station website
   El Nuevo Zol 97.1

Broadcasting companies of the United States
Radio broadcasting companies of the United States
Television broadcasting companies of the United States
Spanish-language broadcasting in the United States
Companies based in Miami
American companies established in 1960
Mass media companies established in 1960
Radio stations established in 1960
1960 establishments in Florida